Abbasabad (also Romanized as ‘Abbāsābād; also known as Kalāteh-ye ‘Abbāsābād) is a village in Kahshang Rural District, in the Central District of Birjand County, South Khorasan Province, Iran. At the 2016 census, its population was 30, in 9 families.

References 

Populated places in Birjand County